Iratusaurus is an extinct genus of dissorophoid temnospondyl within the family Dissorophidae. It was described by Gubin (1980) on the basis of a fragmentary posterior skull. It is estimated to have been comparably large to Kamacops, another Russian dissorophid, but little more can be said about it, and it is rarely mentioned in comparative descriptions and has never been tested in a phylogenetic analysis. Distinguishing features include a large, triangular otic notch and a median crest on the postparietals.

See also

 List of prehistoric amphibians

References

Dissorophids
Permian temnospondyls
Fossils of Russia
Prehistoric amphibian genera